Alexander Gosse "Algy" Hay (2 October 1874 – 28 August 1901) was an Australian rules footballer. He played 10 games for St Kilda in the inaugural Victorian Football League season in 1897 and kicked one goal. His debut match was the Round 1 clash with Collingwood at Victoria Park and he was said to be the smallest player in the VFL at the time.

Hay died from Bright's disease on board a vessel returning from Europe in August 1901.

References

Holmesby, Russell and Main, Jim (2011). The Encyclopedia of AFL Footballers. 9th ed. Melbourne: Bas Publishing.

1874 births
St Kilda Football Club players
Australian rules footballers from Victoria (Australia)
1901 deaths